Simonton Lake is a census-designated place (CDP) in Elkhart County, Indiana, United States. The population was 4,678 at the 2010 census.

History
The community takes its name from the lake. Simonton Lake was named for Samuel Simonton, a 19th-century farmer.

Geography
Simonton Lake is located at  (41.745799, -85.971499).

Demographics

As of the census of 2000, there were 4,053 people, 1,567 households, and 1,181 families residing in the CDP. The racial makeup of the CDP was 94.77% White, 1.63% African American, 0.25% Native American, 1.55% Asian, 0.64% from other races, and 1.16% from two or more races. Hispanic or Latino of any race were 2.52% of the population.

There were 1,567 households, out of which 31.8% had children under the age of 18 living with them, 64.2% were married couples living together, 7.4% had a female householder with no husband present, and 24.6% were non-families. 19.5% of all households were made up of individuals, and 6.6% had someone living alone who was 65 years of age or older. The average household size was 2.59 and the average family size was 2.96.

In the CDP, the population was spread out, with 24.6% under the age of 18, 6.4% from 18 to 24, 28.4% from 25 to 44, 28.7% from 45 to 64, and 11.9% who were 65 years of age or older. The median age was 39 years. For every 100 females, there were 100.0 males. For every 100 females age 18 and over, there were 98.8 males.

The median income for a household in the CDP was $56,539, and the median income for a family was $58,359. Males had a median income of $41,688 versus $26,901 for females. The per capita income for the CDP was $27,327. About 2.4% of families and 2.8% of the population were below the poverty line, including 0.8% of those under age 18 and 3.1% of those age 65 or over.

Education
It is served by Elkhart Community Schools.

References

Census-designated places in Elkhart County, Indiana
Census-designated places in Indiana